White Oak Mountain is a mountain located in northwestern Georgia and southeastern Tennessee. The mountain is part of the Ridge and Valley Appalachians.

Description
White Oak Mountain is one of a series of paralleling ridges running approximately north-northeast in the Tennessee Valley between the Cumberland Plateau/Mountains to the west and the Blue Ridge Mountains to the east. The mountain averages 1,368 feet above sea level, the highest point being 1,495 feet. The mountain begins on the north side of Ringgold Gap, the site of an 1863 Civil War battle, in Catoosa County just east of Ringgold. Interstate 75, US 41/76, and a CSX Railroad run through this gap. The mountain continues to the south as Taylor Ridge, although it is part of the same geologic formation. Upon entering Tennessee, the mountain has several gaps, of which major highways run through, including (from south to north) SR 320 near East Brainerd, Standifer Gap Road, SR 317 near Collegedale, and US 11/64 near Ooltewah in Dead Man's Gap. North of Ooltewah, the Hamilton-Bradley County line follows the westernmost ridge of the formation. Southwest of Cleveland, I-75 crosses the mountain in an artificially cut gap. West of Cleveland, SR 312 crosses the mountain in Mahan Gap. The mountain ends just south of the community of Georgetown.

References

Landforms of Bradley County, Tennessee
Landforms of Hamilton County, Tennessee
Landforms of Catoosa County, Georgia
Mountains of Tennessee